It is a small village of Wazir tribe (Tori Khel) adjacent to Tappi, containing 60 homes according to some old calculation, situated at a 4 km distance toward south from the midpoint (Pir Kalay) of Mir Ali-Miran Shah road...

Toori Khels are divided into Shogi, Khushali and Madikhel subtribes. Khushali people are living here...

Map:
https://mapsengine.google.com/map/edit?mid=zhbMkKcXFq1o.kzShdP7m5q5M

Mir Khon Khel, Federally Administered Tribal Areas, Pakistan

Populated places in North Waziristan